The Honorary Citizen Award is the highest national honour conferred by the Government of Singapore to foreigners since 2003, to recognise and acknowledge the contributions of foreigners who have contributed extensively and significantly to Singapore and its people.

Description
The Honorary Citizen Award was first introduced in 2003, it is the highest national honour for foreigners. The title Honorary Citizen is conferred for life. 

Other existing national awards for foreigners includes the Public Service Star (Distinguished Friends of Singapore) award and the Public Service Medal (Friends of Singapore) award.

The award does not equate to citizenship. Therefore, atypical rights and duties of Singapore citizens, such as voting rights and the requirement to fulfil National Service (NS), do not apply to Honorary Citizens. Additionally, grants and subsidies which Singaporeans are entitled to are not made available to the recipients.

The privileges for the award recipients include the right to live and work in Singapore for themselves as well as their immediate dependent family members and to purchase property if they decide to stay in Singapore.

Administered by Ministry of Manpower, a selection committee panel made up of high-level government officials would receive nominations of foreigners who have rendered extensive and valuable services to Singapore and its people, or who have made a significant impact in the areas of business, science and technology, information communications, education, health, arts and culture, sports, tourism, community services or security. The final selections are then endorsed by the Cabinet of Singapore. Recipients are conferred the Award in the following year of their nomination. The Awards are presented at a formal ceremony by the President of Singapore at the Istana.

, there are 21 recipients being conferred with the title.

Honourees

References

Orders, decorations, and medals of Singapore
Singapore